Khushqadam Khusravov (January 1, 1993, village Rakharv, Vanj District, GBAO, Tajikistan) is a Tajikistani male sambist, judoka. World Champion in sambo (2018).

Biography 
Khushqadam Khusravov was born on January 1, 1993, in the Vanj District. From an early age he showed an interest in the sports that his father is engaged in. At the age of 6, he began training under his guidance at the Wanj District Sports School. Graduated from the Tajik Institute of Physical Training.

In 2007, at the age of 14, Khushqadam, taking part in the republic's school sports day, won all qualifying tournaments and reached the final part, which was held in Dushanbe.

In Dushanbe, he won a gold medal and received an invitation to international sambo competitions in Belarus, and he won bronze.

After returning from Belarus, Khushqadam became a member of the Tajik national sambo team and continued training under the guidance of the famous Tajik wrestler, Master of sports of the USSR, Muhammadsharif Sulaimonov.

Sports results 

 World champion among youth (M&W) and juniors (M&W). October 10—14, 2013 
Multiple champion of Tajikistan in sambo, judo and national wrestling.

References

External links 
 

1993 births
Living people
Tajikistani male martial artists
Tajikistani male judoka
Sportspeople from Dushanbe